The John and Flora Gilbert House is a historic house located in Oregon, Wisconsin. It was added to the National Register of Historic Places on September 6, 2007.

History
John and Flora Gilbert built the Queen Anne style house in 1906, when they retired to Oregon. They lived there until their deaths in 1956 and 1962.

The house is located in the Lincoln Street Historic District.

References

Houses in Dane County, Wisconsin
Houses completed in 1906
Houses on the National Register of Historic Places in Wisconsin
Queen Anne architecture in Wisconsin
National Register of Historic Places in Dane County, Wisconsin
1906 establishments in Wisconsin